Charles Cochran may refer to:

 Charles F. Cochran (1846–1906), U.S. Representative from Missouri
 Charles B. Cochran (1872–1951), British theatrical manager
 Charles Cochran (South Carolina politician) (1766–1833), intendant (mayor) of Charleston, South Carolina
 Charles Cochran (cricketer) (1800–1885), English cricketer
 Charles Douglas Cochran (1941–2012), U.S. Army officer